is a single leg takedown in Judo adopted later by the Kodokan into their Shinmeisho No Waza (newly accepted techniques) list. It is categorized as a hand technique, Te-waza.

Technique Description 
Kuchiki taoshi is sometimes translated as "dead tree drop". In this throw the leg of the opponent is grabbed with one arm while pushing him onto his back.

Included Systems 
Systems:
Kodokan Judo, List of Kodokan Judo techniques
Lists:
The Canon Of Judo
Judo technique

External links 
 Information on the Techniques of Judo.
 Execution of the technique on YouTube

Judo technique